The Washford River rises at  near Luxborough in the Brendon Hills and flows through Somerset to the Bristol Channel at Watchet.

The river valley passes through the Cleeve Hill Site of Special Scientific Interest, and close to Cleeve Abbey.

References

Washford, River